The 2012 Sylvania 300 was a NASCAR Sprint Cup Series stock car race held on September 23, 2012 at  New Hampshire Motor Speedway in Loudon, New Hampshire. Contested over 300 laps, it was the twenty-eighth in the 2012 NASCAR Sprint Cup Series, as well as the second race in the ten-race Chase for the Sprint Cup, which ends the season. Denny Hamlin of Joe Gibbs Racing won the race, his fifth of the season. Jimmie Johnson finished second and Jeff Gordon was third.

Standings after the race

Note: Only the first twelve positions are included for the driver standings.

References 

NASCAR races at New Hampshire Motor Speedway
Sylvania 300
Sylvania 300
Sylvania 300